Harry Shepard Knapp (June 27, 1856 – April 6, 1923) was a Vice Admiral of the United States Navy, Military Governor of Santo Domingo, and Military Representative of the United States in Haiti.

Biography
Born in New Britain, Connecticut, Knapp graduated from the United States Naval Academy on 20 June 1878. After serving in screw steamer , as cadet midshipman, and in the steam frigate  and the sloop  as a midshipman, he was commissioned as ensign on 8 July 1882. Following assignments to a number of ships and stations ashore, he was an executive officer on a gunboat at the outbreak of the Spanish–American War. Outstanding service in a variety of important billets afloat and ashore was rewarded on 3 August 1908 when Knapp assumed command of the protected cruiser .

Promoted to captain in 1909, Knapp was assigned to the General Board on 8 January 1910. At about this time he served intermittently on the Joint Army and Navy Board for Defense of the Panama Canal. He was in charge of  while she was fitted out and commanded the battleship when she first commissioned on 15 September 1911. He took command of Cruiser Force, Atlantic Fleet on 8 November 1915. He succeeded Francisco Henríquez y Carvajal as ruler of Santo Domingo in 1916.

Knapp was promoted to rear admiral on 17 March 1917 and a week before the United States entered World War I was appointed Military Governor of Santo Domingo (now the Dominican Republic) and Military Representative of the United States in Haiti.

"Meritorious service" in this post, laboring to protect Allied shipping from German U-boats and to make the Caribbean Sea secure from enemy aggression, earned Rear Admiral Knapp the Navy Cross. Soon after the armistice, he was Naval Attaché in London with staff duties and on 4 February 1920 assumed command of U.S. Naval Forces operating in European waters with rank of vice admiral. Even after Vice Admiral Knapp was placed on the retired list effective 27 June 1920, the Navy utilized his singular abilities. This won him temporary active duty as a consultant and as quasi-diplomat. He died at Hartford, Connecticut on 6 April 1923.

Namesake
The   was named in his honor.

References

External links
 Ships Bell of the USS Pittsburgh Marker
 Harry Shepard Knapp Papers, 1874-1924 MS 225 held by Special Collections & Archives, Nimitz Library at the United States Naval Academy

1856 births
1923 deaths
People from New Britain, Connecticut
United States Naval Academy alumni
United States military governors
United States Navy vice admirals
Recipients of the Navy Cross (United States)
United States naval attachés